Klaus Hinrich Thomforde (born 1 December 1962) is a German former professional footballer who played as a goalkeeper. He spent his entire professional career with FC St. Pauli. Following his retirement as a player became a coach.

References

1962 births
Living people
German footballers
Association football goalkeepers
FC St. Pauli players
Bundesliga players
German football managers
Holstein Kiel managers